The Kegworth air disaster occurred when British Midland Airways Flight 092, a Boeing 737-400, crashed onto the motorway embankment between the M1 motorway and A453 road near Kegworth, Leicestershire, England, while attempting to make an emergency landing at East Midlands Airport on 8 January 1989.

The aircraft was on a scheduled flight from London Heathrow Airport to Belfast International Airport when a fan blade broke in the left engine, disrupting the air conditioning and filling the cabin with smoke. The pilots believed this indicated a fault in the right engine, since earlier models of the 737 ventilated the cabin from the right, and they were unaware that the 737-400 used a different system. The pilots mistakenly shut down the functioning engine. They selected full thrust from the malfunctioning one and this increased its fuel supply, causing it to catch fire. Of the 126 people aboard, 47 died and 74 sustained serious injuries.  The inquiry attributed the blade fracture to metal fatigue, caused by heavy vibration in the newly upgraded engines, which had been tested only in the laboratory and not under representative flight conditions.

The accident was the first hull loss of a Boeing 737 Classic aircraft, and the first fatal accident (and second fatal occurrence) involving a Boeing 737 Classic aircraft.

Involved

Aircraft
The aircraft was a British Midland-operated Boeing 737-4Y0, registration  on a scheduled flight from London Heathrow Airport to Belfast International Airport, Northern Ireland, having already flown from Heathrow to Belfast and back that day. The 737-400 was the newest design from Boeing, with the first unit entering service less than four months earlier, in September 1988. G-OBME itself had been in service for 85 days, since 15 October 1988, and had accumulated 521 airframe hours. The aircraft was powered by two CFM International CFM56 turbofan engines.

Cockpit crew
The flight was crewed by 43-year-old Captain Kevin Hunt and 39-year-old First Officer David McClelland. Captain Hunt was a veteran British Midland pilot who had been with the airline since 1966 and had about 13,200 hours of flying experience. First Officer McClelland joined British Midland in 1988 and had accrued roughly 3,300 total flight hours. Between them, the pilots had close to 1,000 hours in the Boeing 737 cockpit (Hunt had 763 hours, and McClelland had 192 hours). However only 76 of these were logged in Boeing 737-400 series aircraft (Hunt 23 hours and McClelland 53 hours).

Incident

After taking off from Heathrow at 19:52, Flight BD 092 was climbing through  to reach its cruising altitude of  when a blade detached from the fan of the port (left) engine. While the pilots did not know the source of the problem, a pounding noise was suddenly heard, accompanied by severe vibrations. In addition, smoke poured into the cabin through the ventilation system, and passengers became aware of the smell of burning. Several passengers sitting near the rear of the plane noticed smoke and sparks coming from the left engine. The flight was diverted to nearby East Midlands Airport at the suggestion of British Midland Airways Operations.

After the initial blade fracture, Captain Kevin Hunt had disengaged the plane's autopilot. When Hunt asked First Officer David McClelland which engine was malfunctioning, McClelland replied: "It's the left.... It's the right one". In previous versions of the 737, the right air conditioning pack, fed with compressor bleed air from the right (number 2) engine, supplied air to the flight deck, while the left air conditioning pack, fed from the left (number 1) engine, supplied air to the passenger cabin. On the 737-400, this division of air is blurred; the left pack feeds the flight deck, but also feeds the aft passenger cabin, while the right feeds the forward passenger cabin. The pilots had been used to the older version of the aircraft and did not realise that this aircraft (which had been flown by British Midland for only 520 hours over a two-month period) was different. The captain later claimed that his perception of smoke as coming forward from the passenger cabin led them to assume the fault was in the right engine. The pilots throttled back the working right engine instead of the malfunctioning left engine. They had no way of visually checking the engines from the cockpit, and the cabin crew — who did not hear the captain refer to the right hand engine in his cabin address — did not inform them that smoke and flames had been seen from the left engine.

When the pilots shut down the right engine, they could no longer smell the smoke, which led them to believe that they had correctly dealt with the problem. As it turned out, this was a coincidence; when the autothrottle was disengaged prior to shutting down the right engine, the fuel flow to both engines was reduced, and the excess fuel, which had been igniting in the left engine exhaust, disappeared; therefore, the ongoing damage was reduced, the smell of smoke ceased, and the vibration reduced, although it would still have been visible on cockpit instruments.

During the final approach to the East Midlands Airport, the pilots selected increased thrust from the operating, damaged engine. This led to an engine fire that caused the engine to cease operating entirely. The ground proximity warning system activated, sounding several "glideslope" warnings. At 20:24:33, Captain Hunt broadcast to the passengers via the aircraft's public-address system: "Prepare for crash landing," instructing passengers to take the brace position. The stick shaker then activated. Just before crossing the M1 motorway at 20:24:43, the tail and main landing gear struck the ground and the aircraft bounced back into the air and over the motorway, knocking down trees and a lamp post before crashing on the far embankment around 475 m (519 yd) short of the active runway's paved surface and about 630 m (689 yd) from its threshold. The aircraft broke into three sections. This was adjacent to the motorway; remarkably,  no vehicles were travelling on that part of the M1 at the moment of the crash.

Casualties
Of the 118 passengers on board, 39 were killed outright in the crash and eight died later of their injuries, for a total of 47 fatalities. All eight crew members survived the accident. Of the 79 survivors, 74 suffered serious injuries and five suffered minor injuries. In addition, five firefighters also suffered minor injuries during the rescue operation. No one on the motorway was injured, and all vehicles in the vicinity of the disaster were undamaged. The first person to arrive at the scene to render aid was a motorist, Graham Pearson. A former Royal Marine, he helped passengers for over three hours and subsequently received damages for post-traumatic stress disorder. Aid was also given by an eight strong troop of SAS soldiers, four of whom were regimentally qualified paramedics. Their truck had been on the motorway when the crash occurred.

Causes
The investigation established that the wiring associated with the fire warning lights was not cross-wired (left/right), i.e. it was properly connected.

Shutting down of wrong engine
Captain Hunt believed the right engine was malfunctioning due to the smell of smoke in the cabin because in previous Boeing 737 variants bleed air for cabin air conditioning was taken from the right engine. Starting with the Boeing 737-400 variant, Boeing had redesigned the system to use bleed air from both engines. Several cabin staff and passengers noticed that the left engine had a stream of unburnt fuel igniting in the jet exhaust, but this information was not passed to the pilots because cabin staff assumed they were aware that the left engine was malfunctioning.

The smell of smoke disappeared when the autothrottle was disengaged and the right engine shut down due to reduction of fuel to the damaged left engine as it reverted to manual throttle. In the event of a malfunction, pilots were trained to check all meters and review all decisions, and Captain Hunt proceeded to do so. He did not resume the review after the transmission ended, and instead commenced descent. 

The dials on the two vibration gauges (one for each engine) were smaller than on the previous versions of the 737 in which the pilots had the majority of their experience and the LED needle went around the outside of the dial as opposed to the inside. The pilots had received no simulator training on the new model, as no simulator for the 737-400 existed in the UK at that time. At the time, vibration indicators were known for being unreliable (and normally ignored by pilots), but unknown to the pilots, this was one of the first aircraft to have a very accurate vibration readout.

Engine malfunction
Analysis of the engine from the crash determined that the fan blades (LP stage 1 compressor) of the uprated CFM International CFM56 engine used on the 737-400 were subject to abnormal amounts of vibration when operating at high power settings above . As it was an upgrade to an existing engine, in-flight testing was not mandatory, and the engine had only been tested in the laboratory. Upon this discovery, the remaining 99 Boeing 737-400s then in service were grounded and the engines modified. Following the crash,  testing all newly designed and significantly redesigned turbofan engines under representative flight conditions is now mandatory.

This unnoticed vibration created excessive metal fatigue in the fan blades, and on G-OBME, this caused one of the fan blades to break off. This damaged the engine terminally and also upset its delicate balance, causing a reduction in power and an increase in vibration. The autothrottle attempted to compensate for this by increasing the fuel flow to the engine. The damaged engine was unable to burn all the additional fuel, with much of it igniting in the exhaust flow, creating a large trail of flame behind the engine.

Aftermath

The official report into the disaster made 31 safety recommendations. Evaluation of the injuries sustained led to considerable improvements in aircraft safety and emergency instructions for passengers. These were derived from a research programme funded by the CAA and carried out by teams from the University of Nottingham and Hawtal Whiting Structures (an engineering consultancy company). The study between medical staff and engineers used analytical "occupant kinematics" techniques to assess the effectiveness of the brace position. A new notice to operators revising the brace position was issued in October 1993.

The research into this accident led to the formation on 21 November 2016 of the International Board for Research into Aircraft Crash Events, which is a joint co-operation between experts in the field for the purpose of producing an internationally agreed-upon, evidence-based set of impact bracing positions for passengers and (eventually) cabin crew members in a variety of seating configurations. These will be submitted to the International Civil Aviation Organization through its Cabin Safety Group. 
 

A memorial was built to "those who died, those who were injured and those who took part in the rescue operation", in the village cemetery in nearby Kegworth, together with a garden made using soil from the crash site.

Captain Hunt and First Officer McClelland, both seriously injured in the crash, were dismissed following the criticisms of their actions in the Air Accidents Investigation Branch report. Hunt suffered injuries to his spine and legs in the crash. In April 1991, he told a BBC documentary: "We were the easy option—the cheap option if you wish. We made a mistake — we both made mistakes — but the question we would like answered is why we made those mistakes." BM later paid McClelland an out-of-court settlement for unfair dismissal.

Alan Webb, the chief fire officer at East Midlands Airport, was made an MBE in the 1990 New Year Honours list for the co-ordination of his team in the rescue efforts that followed the crash. Graham Pearson, a passing motorist who assisted Kegworth survivors at the crash site for three hours, sued the airline for post-traumatic stress disorder and was awarded £57,000 in damages in 1998.

Media
The crash was featured in a 1991 documentary of Taking Liberties named "Fatal Error".   ITV aired a documentary in 1999 of the Kegworth crash. Flight 092 was also featured in an episode of Seconds From Disaster, called "Motorway Plane Crash".

It was also featured in the 2011 Discovery Channel documentary Aircrash Confidential.

In 2015, the incident was featured in the episode "Choosing Sides" or "M1 Plane Crash" of the documentary television series Mayday or Air Crash Investigation as it is known in the UK.

See also
TransAsia Airways Flight 235, SA Airlink Flight 8911 and Azerbaijan Airlines Flight 56 - other cases of wrong engine shutdown
List of accidents and incidents involving commercial aircraft

Notes

References

References

Bibliography

Macarthur Job, Air Disaster Volume 2: Aerospace Publications Pty Ltd, 1996, p. 173–185
David Owen, Air Accident Investigation: Patrick Stephens Limited, 2001, . (The Kegworth air disaster is given a detailed mention in Chapter 9, "Pressing the Wrong Button")
HW Structures, CAA Paper 90012 Occupant modelling in aircraft crash conditions: Civil Aviation Authority, 1990, . 
Hawtal Whiting Technology Group, CAA Paper 95004 A study of aircraft passenger brace positions for impact: Civil Aviation Authority, 1995, 

Report file (G-OBME.pdf Archive)
Appendices (G-OBME Append.pdf Archive)

External links
BBC 10th anniversary page about the crash
BBC 'On This Day' page about the crash
Pre-crash and crash pictures of the aircraft from Airliners.net
 

Transport in Leicestershire
Airliner accidents and incidents caused by mechanical failure
Airliner accidents and incidents caused by pilot error
Aviation accidents and incidents in 1989
Aviation accidents and incidents in England
British Midland International accidents and incidents
1989 disasters in the United Kingdom
1989 in England
1980s in Leicestershire
History of Leicestershire
1989 in Northern Ireland
Accidents and incidents involving the Boeing 737 Classic
East Midlands Airport
North West Leicestershire District
M1 motorway
January 1989 events in the United Kingdom
Airliner accidents and incidents in the United Kingdom
Airliner accidents and incidents caused by design or manufacturing errors
Airliner accidents and incidents caused by engine failure
Airliner accidents and incidents caused by wrong engine shutdown